The 2009 Rhode Island Rams football team represented the University of Rhode Island in the 2009 NCAA Division I FCS football season as a member of the Colonial Athletic Association (CAA). The Rams were led by first year head coach Joe Trainer and played their home games at Meade Stadium. They finished the season with one win and ten losses (1–10, 0–8 in CAA play) and finished in last place in the conference.

Schedule
*Schedule Source:

References

Rhode Island
Rhode Island Rams football seasons
Rhode Island Rams football